Spongiochloris is a genus of green algae, in the family Chlorococcaceae.

References

External links

Chlorococcaceae
Chlorococcaceae genera